Holocaust victims were people targeted by the government of Nazi Germany based on their ethnicity, religion, political beliefs, and/or sexual orientation. The institutionalized practice by the Nazis of singling out and persecuting people resulted in the Holocaust, which began with legalized social discrimination against specific groups, involuntary hospitalization, euthanasia, and forced sterilization of persons considered physically or mentally unfit for society. The vast majority of the Nazi regime's victims were Jews, Sinti-Roma peoples, and Slavs but victims also encompassed people identified as social outsiders in the Nazi worldview, such as homosexuals, and political enemies. Nazi persecution escalated during World War II and included: non-judicial incarceration, confiscation of property, forced labor, sexual slavery, death through overwork, human experimentation, undernourishment, and execution through a variety of methods. For specified groups like the Jews, genocide was the Nazis' primary goal.

According to the United States Holocaust Memorial Museum (USHMM), the Holocaust was "the systematic, bureaucratic, state-sponsored persecution and murder of six million Jewish men, women and children by the Nazi regime and its collaborators". In addition, 11 million members of other groups were murdered during the "era of the Holocaust".

Scope of usage

While the term Holocaust generally refers to the systematic mass-murder of the Jewish people in German-occupied Europe, the Nazis also murdered a large number of non-Jewish people who were also considered subhuman (Untermenschen) or undesirable. Some victims belonged to several categories targeted for extermination, e.g. an assimilated Jew who was a member of a communist party or someone of Jewish ancestry who identified as a Jehovah's Witness.

Non-Jewish victims of Nazism included Slavs (e.g. Russians, Belarusians, Poles, Ukrainians and Serbs), Romanis (gypsies), homosexual men; the mentally or physically disabled, mentally ill; Soviet POWs, Roman Catholics, Protestants, Jehovah's Witnesses, Spanish Republicans, Freemasons, Black Europeans (especially the Afro-German Mischlinge, called "Rhineland Bastards" by Hitler and the Nazi regime), and other minorities not considered Aryan (Herrenvolk, or part of the "master race"); leftists, communists, trade unionists, capitalists, social democrats, socialists, anarchists, and other dissidents who disagreed with the Nazi regime.

Taking into account all of the victims of persecution, the Nazis systematically murdered an estimated six million Jews and an additional 11 million people during the war. Donald Niewyk suggests that the broadest definition, including Soviet civilian deaths, would produce a death toll of 17 million.

Despite widely varying treatment (some groups were actively targeted for genocide while others were not), some died in concentration camps such as Dachau and others from various forms of Nazi brutality. According to extensive documentation (written and photographic) left by the Nazis, eyewitness testimony by survivors, perpetrators and bystanders and records of the occupied countries, most perished in death camps such as Auschwitz-Birkenau.

Ethnic criteria

Jews

The military campaign to displace persons like the Jews from Germany and other German-held territories during World War II, often with extreme brutality, is known as the Holocaust. It was carried out primarily by German forces and collaborators, German and non-German. Early in the war, millions of Jews were concentrated in urban ghettos. In 1941, Jews were massacred, and by December, Hitler had decided to exterminate all Jews living in Europe at that time. The European Jewish population was reduced from 9,740,000 to 3,642,000; the world's Jewish population was reduced by one-third, from roughly 16.6 million in 1939 to about 11 million in 1946. The extermination of Jews had been a priority to the Nazis, regardless of the consequences.

In January 1942, during the Wannsee Conference, several Nazi leaders discussed the details of the "Final Solution to the Jewish Question" (Endlösung der Judenfrage) and German State Secretary Josef Bühler urged conference chairman Reinhard Heydrich to proceed with the Final Solution in the General Government. Jewish populations were systematically deported from the ghettos and the occupied territories to the seven camps designated as Vernichtungslager (extermination camps):
 Auschwitz-Birkenau
 Belzec
 Chelmno
 Majdanek
 Maly Trostenets
 Sobibór
 Treblinka
In 1978, Sebastian Haffner wrote that in December 1941, Hitler began to accept the failure of his primary goal—to dominate Europe, after his declaration of war against the United States, and his withdrawal—was compensated for by his secondary goal: the extermination of the Jews. As the Nazi war machine faltered during the war's final years, military resources such as fuel, transport, munitions, soldiers and industrial resources were still diverted from the fronts to the death camps.

In Polandhome of Europe's largest Jewish community before the warthe Nazis murdered 3.3 million Jews, or 90 percent of its Jewish population.  Although reports of the Holocaust had reached Western leaders, public awareness in the United States and other democracies of the mass murder of Jews in Poland was low at the time; the first references in The New York Times, in 1942, were unconfirmed reports rather than front-page news.

Greece, Yugoslavia, Hungary, Lithuania, Bohemia, the Netherlands, Slovakia and Latvia lost over 70 percent of their Jewish populations; in Belgium, Romania, Luxembourg, Norway, and Estonia, the figure was about 50 percent. Over one-third of the Soviet Union's Jews were murdered; France lost about 25 percent of its Jewish population, Italy between 15% and 20%. Denmark evacuated nearly all of its Jews to nearby neutral Sweden; the Danish resistance movement, with the assistance of many Danish citizens, evacuated 7,220 of the country's 7,800 Jews by sea to Sweden, in vessels ranging from fishing boats to private yachts. The rescue allowed the vast majority of Denmark's Jewish population to avoid capture by the Nazis. Jews outside Europe under Axis occupation were also affected by the Holocaust in Italian Libya, Algeria, Tunisia, Morocco, Iraq, Japan, and China.

Although Jews are an ethnoreligious group, they were defined by the Nazis on purely racial grounds. The Nazi Party viewed the Jewish religion as irrelevant, persecuting Jews in accordance with antisemitic stereotypes of an alleged biologically determined heritage. Defining Jews as the chief enemy, Nazi racial ideology was also used to persecute other minorities.

The Yad Vashem museum has created, in an ongoing collaboration with many partners, a database with the names and biographical details of close to 4.8 of the 6 million Jews murdered by the Nazis and their accomplices during the Holocaust, as well as those whose fate has yet to be determined. The names of more than one million victims remain unknown and are still being collected.

Slavs

The Slavs were one of the most widely persecuted groups during the war, with many Poles, Russians, Ukrainians, Slovenes, Serbs and others killed by the Nazis.
According to British historian Ian Kershaw, the Nazis' genocide and brutality was their way of ensuring Lebensraum ("living space") for those who met Hitler's narrow racial requirements; this necessitated the elimination of Bolsheviks and Slavs:

Poles

The Nazi occupation of Poland was among the most brutal of the war, resulting in the murder of more than 1.8 million ethnic Poles and about 3 million Polish Jews. The six million Jewish, Roman Catholic and Orthodox Poles represented nearly 17 percent of the country's population. Poles were one of Hitler's first extermination targets, as he outlined in a 22 August 1939 speech to Wehrmacht commanders before the invasion. Intelligentsia, socially prominent, and influential people were primarily targeted, although ethnic Poles and other Slavic groups were also killed en masse. Hundreds of thousands of Roman Catholic and Orthodox Poles were sent to Auschwitz-Birkenau and other concentration camps, and the intelligentsia were the first targets of the Einsatzgruppen death squads. The anti-Polish campaign culminated in the near-complete destruction of Warsaw, ordered by Hitler and Himmler in 1944. The original assumptions of Generalplan Ost were based on plans to exterminate around 85% (over 20 million) of ethnically Polish citizens of Poland, with the remaining 15% to be used as slaves.

Ukrainians

Between 1941 and 1945, approximately three million Ukrainian and other gentiles were murdered as part of Nazi extermination policies in present-day Ukraine. More Ukrainians were killed fighting the Wehrmacht in the Red Army than American, British and French soldiers combined. Original Nazi plans called for the extermination of 65 percent of the nation's 23.2 million Ukrainians, with the survivors treated as slaves. Over two million Ukrainians were deported to Germany as slave labor. The ten-year plan would have exterminated, expelled, Germanized or enslaved most (or all) Ukrainians.

Soviet Slavs and POWs

During Operation Barbarossa (the Axis invasion of the Soviet Union), millions of Red Army prisoners of war were summarily executed in the field by German armies (the Waffen SS in particular), died under inhumane conditions in German prisoner of war camps, on death marches, or had been shipped to concentration camps for execution. The Germans killed an estimated 2.8 million Soviet POWs by starvation, exposure, and execution over an eight-month period in 1941–42. According to the U.S. Holocaust Memorial Museum, by the winter of 1941 "starvation and disease resulted in mass death of unimaginable proportions". 140,000-500,000 Soviet citizens and POWs were murdered in the concentration camps.

Soviet civilian populations in the occupied areas were severely persecuted and endured the treacherous conditions of the Eastern Front, which spawned atrocities such as the siege of Leningrad, when 1.2 million civilians died. Thousands of peasant villages across Russia, Belarus and Ukraine were annihilated by German troops. During the occupation, the Leningrad, Pskov and Novgorod regions lost about a quarter of their populations. An estimated one-quarter of Soviet civilian deaths at the hands of the Nazis and their allies (five million Russians, three million Ukrainians and 1.5 million Belarusians) were racially motivated. In 1995, the Russian Academy of Sciences reported that civilian deaths in the occupied USSR, including Jews, at the hands of the Germans totaled 13.7 million dead (20 percent of the population of 68 million). The figure includes 7.4 million victims of Nazi genocide and reprisals, 2.2 million deaths of persons deported to Germany as forced labour, and 4.1 million famine and disease deaths. An estimated three million people also died of starvation in unoccupied territory. The losses occurred within the 1946–1991 borders of the USSR, and include territories annexed in 1939–40. The deaths of 8.2 million Soviet civilians, including Jews, were documented by the Soviet Extraordinary State Commission.

Romani

The Nazi genocide of the Romani people was ignored by scholars until the 1980s, and opinions continue to differ on its details. According to historians Donald Niewyk and Francis Nicosia, the genocide of the Romani began later than that of the Jews and a smaller percentage was murdered. Hitler's genocidal campaign against Europe's Romani population involved the application of Nazi "racial hygiene" (selective breeding applied to humans). Despite discriminatory measures, some Romani (including some of Germany's Sinti and Lalleri) were spared deportation and death, with the remaining Romani groups suffering a fate similar to that of the Jews. Romani were deported to the Jewish ghettos, were shot by SS Einsatzgruppen in their villages, or deported and gassed in Auschwitz-Birkenau and Treblinka.

Estimates of the Romani death toll in World War II range from 220,000 to 1,500,000.
The Romani genocide was formally recognized by West Germany in 1982 and by Poland in 2011.

Spanish Republicans
Thousands of Spanish Republican refugees were living in France at the time of its occupation by Nazi Germany in 1940; 15,000 were detained in concentration camps, including 7,000 in Mauthausen-Gusen. Around 3,500 were murdered in the camp.

Non-Europeans

The Nazis promoted xenophobia and racism against all "non-Aryan" races. African (black) residents of Germany and black prisoners of war, such as French colonial troops and African Americans, were also victims of Nazi racial policy. When the Nazis came to power, hundreds of African-German children, the offspring of German mothers and African soldiers brought in during the French occupation, lived in the Rhineland. In Mein Kampf, Hitler described the children of marriages to African occupation troops as a contamination of the white race "by Negro blood on the Rhine in the heart of Europe" who were "bastardising the European continent at its core". According to Hitler, "Jews were responsible for bringing Negroes into the Rhineland, with the ultimate idea of bastardising the white race which they hate and thus lowering its cultural and political level so that the Jew might dominate".

Japan signed the Tripartite Pact with Germany and Italy on 27 September 1940, and was part of the Axis. No Japanese people were deliberately imprisoned or killed, since they were considered "honorary Aryans". The same applied to Turks and all other "Ural-Altaic" peoples.
In his political testament Hitler wrote:

People with disabilities

According to their eugenics policy, the Nazis believed that the disabled were a burden to society because they needed care and were considered an affront to their notion of a society composed of a perfect race. About 375,000 people were sterilized against their will due to their disabilities.

Those with disabilities were among the first to be murdered by the Nazis; according to the U.S. Holocaust Memorial Museum, the T-4 Program (established in 1939) was the model for future Nazi exterminations and it set a precedent for the genocide of what they described as the Jewish race. The program attempted to maintain the "purity" of the Aryan race by systematically murdering children and adults with physical deformities or suffering from mental illness, using gas chambers for the first time. Although Hitler formally halted the program in late August 1941, the killings secretly continued until the end of the war and an estimated 275,000 people with congenital disabilities were murdered.

Homosexual men 

Homosexual men were also targets of the Holocaust, since male homosexuality was deemed incompatible with Nazism. The Nazis believed that gay men were weak, effeminate and unable to fight for the German nation; homosexuals were unlikely to produce children and increase the German birthrate. According to the Nazis, "inferior races" produced more children than Aryans, so anything which diminished Germany's reproductive potential was considered a racial danger. Homosexuality was also thought to be contagious by the Nazis. By 1936, Heinrich Himmler was leading efforts to persecute gay men under existing and new anti-homosexual laws. More than one million gay Germans were targeted, of whom at least 100,000 were arrested and 50,000 were convicted and imprisoned. An unknown number were institutionalized in state-run mental hospitals. Hundreds of European gay men living under Nazi occupation were chemically castrated by court order. Although an estimated 5,000 to 15,000 gay men were imprisoned in concentration camps, the number who were murdered is uncertain. According to Austrian survivor Heinz Heger, gay men "suffered a higher mortality rate than other relatively small victim groups, such as Jehovah's Witnesses and political prisoners". Gay men in Nazi concentration camps were identified by a pink triangle on their shirts, along with men convicted of sexually assaulting children and bestiality. According to the U.S. Holocaust Memorial Museum's website, "Nazi Germany did not seek to kill all homosexuals. Nevertheless, the Nazi state, through active persecution, attempted to terrorise German homosexuals into sexual and social conformity, leaving thousands dead and shattering the lives of many more."

Many homosexuals who were liberated from the concentration camps were persecuted in postwar Germany. Survivors were subject to prosecution under Paragraph 175 (which forbade "lewdness between men"), with time served in the concentration camps deducted from their sentences. This contrasted with the treatment of other Holocaust victims, who were compensated for the loss of family members and educational opportunities.

Political victims

Political prisoners 
Another large group of victims was composed of German and foreign civilian activists from across the political spectrum who opposed the Nazi regime, captured resistance fighters (many of whom were executed during—or immediately after—their interrogation, particularly in occupied Poland and France) and, sometimes, their families. German political prisoners were a substantial proportion of the first inmates at Dachau (the prototypical Nazi concentration camp). The political People's Court was notorious for the number of its death sentences.

Leftists 

German communists were among the first to be imprisoned in concentration camps. Their ties to the USSR concerned Hitler, and the Nazi Party was intractably opposed to communism. Rumors of communist violence were spread by the Nazis to justify the Enabling Act of 1933, which gave Hitler his first dictatorial powers. Hermann Göring testified at Nuremberg that Nazi willingness to repress German Communists prompted Hindenburg and the old elite to cooperate with them. Hitler and the Nazis also despised German leftists because of their resistance to Nazi racism. Hitler referred to Marxism and "Bolshevism" as means for "the international Jew" to undermine "racial purity", stir up class tension and mobilize trade unions against the government and business. When the Nazis occupied a territory, communists, socialists and anarchists were usually among the first to be repressed; this included summary executions. An example is Hitler's Commissar Order, in which he demanded the summary execution of all Soviet troops who were political commissars who offered resistance or were captured in battle.

Enemy nationals
Thousands of people, primarily diplomats, of nationalities associated with the Allies (China and Mexico, for example) and Spanish Civil War refugees in occupied France were interned or executed. After Italy's 1943 surrender, many Italian nationals (including partisans and Italian soldiers disarmed by the Germans) were sent to concentration camps.

Other religious persecution

The Nazis also targeted religious groups for political and ideological reasons.

Jehovah's Witnesses

Historian Detlef Garbe, director of the Neuengamme Memorial in Hamburg, wrote about Jehovah's Witnesses: "No other religious movement resisted the pressure to conform to National Socialism [Nazism] with comparable unanimity and steadfastness". Between 2,500 and 5,000 Witnesses were murdered in the concentration camps; unwilling to fight for any cause, they refused to serve in the army.

Roman Catholics

The Catholic Church was persecuted under the Third Reich, with the Nazi leadership hoping to gradually de-Christianize Germany. According to the World Holocaust Remembrance Center, "By the latter part of the decade of the Thirties, church officials were well aware that the ultimate aim of Hitler and other Nazis was the total elimination of Catholicism and of the Christian religion." Hitler vehemently despised Christianity, calling it the enemy of National Socialism. According to historian William Shirer, "under the leadership of Rosenberg, Bormann and Himmler—backed by Hitler—the Nazi regime intended to destroy Christianity in Germany, if it could, and substitute the old paganism of the early tribal Germanic gods and the new paganism of the Nazi extremists". He also wrote that Hitler "inveighed against political Catholicism in Mein Kampf and attacked both of the Christian Churches for their failure to recognise the racial problem...". As reported in the New York Times, Hitler's forces wished to de-Christianize Germany after "the final victory" and destroy Christianity. According to historian Alan Bullock, "Once the war was over, [Hitler] promised himself, he would root out and destroy the influence of the Christian Churches, but until then he would be circumspect." Political Catholicism was a target of Hitler's 1934 Night of the Long Knives. German clergy, nuns and lay leaders were also targeted after the Nazi takeover, leading to thousands of arrests over the following years. Priests who were part of the Catholic resistance were killed. Hitler's invasion of Catholic Poland in 1939 began World War II, and the Nazis targeted clergy, monks and nuns in their campaign to destroy Polish culture.

In 1940, the Priest Barracks of Dachau Concentration Camp was established. Of 2,720 clergy imprisoned at Dachau, the overwhelming majority (94.88 percent) were Catholic. According to Ian Kershaw, about 400 German priests were sent to the camp. Although the Holy See concluded a 1933 concordat with Germany to protect Catholicism in the Third Reich, the Nazis frequently violated the pact in their Kirchenkampf ("struggle with the churches"). They shut down the Catholic press, schools, political parties and youth groups in Germany amid murder and mass arrests. In March 1937, Pope Pius XI issued his Mit brennender Sorge encyclical accusing the Nazi government of violating the 1933 concordat and sowing the "tares of suspicion, discord, hatred, calumny, of secret and open fundamental hostility to Christ and His Church".

The church was especially harshly treated in annexed regions, such as Austria. Viennese Gauleiter Odilo Globocnik confiscated property, closed Catholic organizations and sent many priests to Dachau. In the Czech lands, religious orders were suppressed, schools closed, religious instruction forbidden and priests sent to concentration camps.  Catholic bishops, clergy, nuns and laypeople protested and attacked Nazi policies in occupied territories; in 1942, the Dutch bishops protested the mistreatment of Jews. When Archbishop Johannes de Jong refused to yield to Nazi threats, the Gestapo rounded up Catholic "Jews" and sent 92 to Auschwitz. One Catholic abducted in this manner was nun Edith Stein, who was murdered at Auschwitz along with Poland's Maximilian Kolbe. Other Catholic victims of the Holocaust have been beatified, including Poland's 108 Martyrs of World War II, the Martyrs of Nowogródek, Dutch theologian Titus Brandsma and Germany's Lübeck martyrs and Bernhard Lichtenberg.

Poland 

According to Norman Davies, the Nazi terror was "much fiercer and more protracted in Poland than anywhere in Europe." Polish Catholic victims of the Third Reich numbered in the millions. Nazi ideology viewed ethnic Poles—the mainly Catholic ethnic majority of Poland—as subhuman. After their 1939 invasion of Poland, the Nazis instituted a policy of murdering (or suppressing) the ethnic-Polish elite (including Catholic religious leaders). The Nazi plan for Poland was the nation's destruction, which necessitated attacking the Polish Church, (particularly in areas annexed by Germany). About the brief period of military control from 1 September to 25 October 1939, Davies wrote: "According to one source, 714 mass executions were carried out, and 6,376 people, mainly Catholics, were shot. Others put the death toll in one town alone at 20,000. It was a taste of things to come."

In Polish areas annexed by Nazi Germany, severe persecution began. The Nazis systematically dismantled the church, arresting its leaders, exiling its clergy and closing its churches, monasteries and convents. Germanization of the annexed regions began in December 1939, with deportations of men, women and children. According to Richard J. Evans, in the Reichsgau Wartheland "numerous clergy, monks, diocesan administrators and officials of the Church were arrested, deported to the General Government, taken off to a concentration camp in the Reich, or simply shot. Altogether some 1700 Polish priests ended up at Dachau: half of them did not survive their imprisonment." Among the clergy who were murdered at Dachau were many of the 108 Polish Martyrs of World War II.

Hans Frank said in 1940, "Poles may have only one master—a German. Two masters cannot exist side by side, and this is why all members of the Polish intelligentsia must be killed." Thomas J. Craughwell wrote that from 1939 to 1945, an estimated 3,000 members of the Polish clergy (18 percent) were murdered; of these, 1,992 were murdered in concentration camps. According to the Encyclopædia Britannica, 1,811 Polish priests were murdered in Nazi concentration camps. Among the persecuted resisters was Irena Sendlerowa, head of the children's section of Żegota, who placed more than 2,500 Jewish children in convents, orphanages, schools, hospitals, and homes. Captured by the Gestapo in 1943, Sendlerowa was crippled by torture.

Protestants

The Nazis attempted to deal with Protestant dissent with their ideology by creating the Reich Church, a union of 28 existing Protestant groups espousing Positive Christianity (a doctrine compatible with Nazism). Non-Aryan ministers were suspended and church members called themselves German Christians, with "the swastika on their chest and the cross in their heart." The Protestant opposition to the Nazis established the Confessing Church, a rival umbrella organization of independent German regional churches which was persecuted.

Freemasons 

The Nazis claimed that high-degree Masons were willing members of "the Jewish conspiracy" and Freemasonry was a cause of Germany's defeat in World War I. Reich Security Main Office (Reichssicherheitshauptamt, or RSHA) records indicate the persecution of Freemasons during the Holocaust. RSHA Amt VII (written records), overseen by Franz Six, was responsible for "ideological" tasks: the creation of antisemitic and anti-Masonic propaganda. Although the exact number is unknown, an estimated 80,000 to 200,000 Freemasons were murdered as a result of Hitler's December 1941 Nacht und Nebel directive. Masonic concentration camp inmates, considered political prisoners, wore an inverted red triangle.

Small blue forget-me-nots were first used by the Zur Sonne Grand Lodge in 1926 as a Masonic emblem at its annual convention in Bremen. In 1938, a forget-me-not badge made by the factory which produced the Masonic badge was chosen for the annual Nazi Winterhilfswerk, the charity drive of the National Socialist People's Welfare (the party's welfare branch). The coincidence enabled Freemasons to wear the forget-me-not badge as a secret sign of Masonic membership.

After the war, the forget-me-not was again used as a Masonic emblem at the first annual United Grand Lodges of Germany convention in 1948. The badge is worn on the lapels of Masons worldwide in remembrance of those who have suffered in the name of Freemasonry, particularly during the Nazi era.

Others 
The SS and police conducted mass actions against civilians with alleged links to resistance movements, their families, and villages or city districts. Notorious killings occurred in Lidice, Khatyn, Kragujevac, Sant'Anna and Oradour-sur-Glane, and a district of Warsaw was obliterated. In occupied Poland, Nazi Germany imposed the death penalty on those found sheltering (or aiding) Jews. "Social deviants"—prostitutes, vagrants, alcoholics, drug addicts, open dissidents, pacifists, draft resisters and common criminals—were also imprisoned in concentration camps. The common criminals frequently became Kapos, inmate guards of fellow prisoners.

Some Germans and Austrians who lived abroad for much of their lives were considered to have too much exposure to foreign ideas, and they were sent to concentration camps. These prisoners, known as "emigrants", each wore a blue triangle.

On rare occasions, POWs from Western Allied armies were sent to concentration camps, including 350 Americanssome chosen for being Jewish, but mostly for looking Jewish or for being troublemakers or otherwise 'undesirable'. Some captured in the Battle of the Bulge were forced into slave labor at the Berga concentration camp, a subcamp of Buchenwald; over 70 died. The "KLB Club" was a group of 168 Allied airmenmainly American, British, and Canadianconsidered Terrorfliegers ("terror fliers"), denied POW status, and held at Buchenwald for two months until a German officer arranged their transfer to a standard POW camp, a week before their scheduled execution.

See also
 List of genocides by death toll
 List of victims of Nazism
 Names of the Holocaust

References
Informational notes

Citations

Bibliography

Further reading

External links
 Non-Jewish Victims of Persecution in Nazi Germany on the Yad Vashem website
 The Central Database of Shoah Victims' Names
 Stills from Soviet documentary "The Atrocities committed by German Fascists in the USSR" ((1); (2); (3))
 Slide show "Nazi Crimes in the USSR (Graphic images!)"
 Yahad in Nunum on Shoah victiums
 'Chronicles of Terror' testimony database

 
Victimology